The Diocese of Auckland is one of the thirteen dioceses and hui amorangi of the Anglican Church in Aotearoa, New Zealand and Polynesia. The Diocese covers the area stretching from North Cape down to the Waikato River, across the Hauraki Plains and including the Coromandel Peninsula.

The Diocese of New Zealand was established in 1841, and originally covered the entire country. In 1842, her jurisdiction was described as simply "New Zealand". In 1854, it was limited to the Auckland region only. By act of the fourth General Synod (anticipating Selwyn's retirement), 15 October 1868 the diocese was renamed the Diocese of Auckland; Selwyn was called Bishop of New Zealand until his resignation of the See in 1869, whereas Cowie was called Bishop of Auckland from the announcement of his nomination.

The current bishop is Ross Graham Bay, who was enthroned as the 11th Bishop of Auckland at the Cathedral of the Holy Trinity on Saturday, 17 April 2010.

The theological college is the College of St John the Evangelist.

List of bishops

Assistant bishops
Gething Caulton, Vicar of Northcote and then Epsom, former Bishop of Melanesia, was an assistant bishop, 1955–1964. Monty Monteith was assistant bishop from his consecration, 24 February 1965, until his death, 12 June 2003. Ted Buckle was assistant bishop for the Northern Region, 198130 June 1992; Bruce Moore for the Southern Region, 24 February 1992September 1997; and Richard Randerson (vicar-general and Dean) an assistant bishop, 2002–2007. Godfrey Wilson became Assistant Bishop in 1980 and retired on 30 November 1991. Jim White became Assistant Bishop of Auckland with his consecration as a bishop on 29 October 2011.

Archdeaconries
In 1866, the New Zealand diocese had three archdeaconries: G. A. Kissling was Archdeacon of Waitemata, Henry Govett of Taranaki, and H. Williams of Waimate.

Archdeacons of Waitmata
1853–1858: Charles Abraham (Bishop of Wellington)
1859–1865: George Kissling

See also 

 King's College, Auckland

References

External links
 Official website

Religious organizations established in 1841
Auckland
Anglican bishops of Auckland
Anglican dioceses established in the 19th century
Christianity in Auckland
1841 establishments in New Zealand